The 1972–73 Danish 1. division season was the 16th season of ice hockey in Denmark. Ten teams participated in the league, and Herning IK won the championship. IK Aalborg was relegated.

Regular season

External links
Season on eliteprospects.com

Danish
1972 in Danish sport
1973 in Danish sport